Sukhjeet Kaur "Sukh" Ojla (born 31 May 1984) is an English stand-up comedian, novelist, playwright and comedy writer.

Early life

Ojla is from a working-class British Punjabi Sikh family. After school, she attended drama school at the Court Theatre Training Company.

Career

Ojla has acted in Black Mirror ("White Christmas"), Hospital People, EastEnders, GameFace, The End of the F***ing World and the film Victoria and Abdul.

Her stage work has included Gurpreet Kaur Bhatti's Elephant (Birmingham Repertory Theatre) and Tamsin Oglesby's Future Conditional (The Old Vic).

Ojla began to perform stand-up comedy in 2016. She has appeared on The Big Asian Stand-Up and Mock the Week.

Ojla wrote and starred in the play Pyar Actually in 2017.

Ojla published her first novel, Sunny, in 2021.

References

External links

English women comedians
Living people
English people of Punjabi descent
1984 births
English women dramatists and playwrights
English actresses of South Asian descent
21st-century English actresses
Actresses from London
English soap opera actresses
English television actresses
English film actresses
21st-century English comedians
21st-century English women writers
English people of Indian descent
British actresses of Indian descent